Marlon is an American sitcom television series that stars Marlon Wayans, Essence Atkins, Notlim Taylor, Amir O'Neil, Bresha Webb and Diallo Riddle. On May 13, 2016, it was ordered to series. The series premiered on August 16, 2017, on NBC.

On September 28, 2017, NBC renewed the series for a second season, which aired from June 14 to July 12, 2018. On December 21, 2018, NBC canceled the series after two seasons.

In 2018, Netflix acquired exclusive distribution of Marlon in many regions around the world, including the United Kingdom. Outside of the US, Marlon is advertised as a "Netflix Original".

Premise
Despite their inability to coexist, divorced couple Marlon Wayne and his ex-wife Ashley try to stay friends for the sake of their two children, Marley and Zack.

The premise of the show is loosely based on star Marlon Wayans' own life.

Characters
Marlon Wayans as Marlon Wayne– A loving but often inappropriate divorced father of two, Marlon often acts the most childish of the house and is therefore the more youth-relatable parent. The typical clingy ex, Marlon is always doing things out of the ordinary. Deep down he loves his family, he just has an odd way of showing it.
Essence Atkins as Ashley Wayne – Always keeping things calm in the house, Ashley is usually the peacemaker in the family and has to get things back to normal after Marlon hypes things up. Ashley is trying to move on from the divorce but things are complicated.
Notlim Taylor as Marley Wayne – Marley is the calm one in the family. She is very intelligent and responsible, and rarely ever gets in trouble. She's a quick-thinker and a role-model. 
Amir O'Neil as Zack Wayne – Zack is the troublesome kid in the family and always makes a mess in the house. He doesn't really care about feelings or emotions because he is usually busy being silly and air-headed.
Bresha Webb as Yvette Brown – Ashley's best friend who is often busy trying to find the right guy. Yvette is a God-loving woman with a packed past, of which Marlon always tries his best to make fun. She has a petty feud with him and they're always going back and forth.
Diallo Riddle as Stephandre Jamal “Stevie” Noggle – Stevie took it upon himself to shack up in Marlon's apartment, much to Marlon's annoyance. Despite being well-educated, he is perpetually unemployed. He considers himself Marlon's best friend, and even though Marlon disagrees with this, Stevie is arguably his only friend. Stevie has an unrequited crush on Yvette, that the latter will sometimes use to her advantage such as getting free stuff or using Stevie to make other men jealous. Needless to say, it always backfires on the both of them.

Episodes

Season 1 (2017)

Season 2 (2018)

Reception

Critical response
The review aggregator website Rotten Tomatoes reported a 50% approval rating with an average rating of 5.3/10 based on 10 reviews. The website's critical consensus reads, "Marlon Wayans is an engaging comedian and performer, but his energetic brand of mischievous humor is ill-served by the conventionality of this square sitcom". Metacritic, which uses a weighted average, assigned a score of 55 out of 100 based on 6 critics, indicating "mixed or average reviews".

Ratings

Season 1 (2017)

Season 2 (2018)

Accolades

References

External links
 
 

2017 American television series debuts
2018 American television series endings
2010s American sitcoms
English-language television shows
2010s American black sitcoms
NBC original programming
Television series about families
Television series by 3 Arts Entertainment
Television series by Universal Television
Television shows set in Los Angeles